Leonard Joseph Rose (July 27, 1918 – November 16, 1984) was an American cellist and pedagogue.

Biography 
Rose was born in Washington, D.C. His parents were Jewish immigrants, his father from Bragin, Belarus, and his mother from Kyiv, Ukraine. Rose took lessons from Walter Grossman, Frank Miller and Felix Salmond. After completing his studies at Philadelphia's Curtis Institute of Music at age 20, he joined Arturo Toscanini's NBC Symphony Orchestra, and almost immediately became associate principal. At 21 he was principal cellist of the Cleveland Orchestra and at 26 became the principal of the New York Philharmonic.

He made many recordings as a soloist after 1951, including concertos with conductors such as Leonard Bernstein, Eugene Ormandy, George Szell and Bruno Walter among others. Rose also joined with Isaac Stern and Eugene Istomin in a celebrated piano trio.

Rose's legacy as a teacher remains to this day: his students from the Juilliard School, Curtis Institute and Ivan Galamian's Meadowmount Summer School fill the sections of many American orchestras, notably those of the Boston Symphony Orchestra, Cleveland Orchestra, Philadelphia Orchestra, and the New York Philharmonic. His pupils include Lori Singer, Raymond Davis, Desmond Hoebig, Peter Stumpf, Fred Sherry, Christopher von Baeyer, Myung-wha Chung, Patrick Sohn, Thomas Demenga, Stephen Kates, Lynn Harrell, Yehuda Hanani, Hans Jørgen Jensen, Steven Honigberg, Eric Kim, Roger Drinkall, Robert deMaine, Bruce Uchimura, Donald Whitton, Yo-Yo Ma, Ronald Leonard, Steven Pologe, Sara Sant'Ambrogio, Matt Haimovitz, Mats Lidström, Richard Hirschl, John Sant’Ambrogio, and Marijane Carr Siegal. 
He played an Amati cello dated 1662, played today by Gary Hoffman.
Rose died in White Plains, New York, of leukemia.

In November 2009, a memorial marker was placed for Rose in the Mt. Ararat Cemetery in Farmingdale, New York, next to the grave of his first wife, Minnie Knopow Rose, who died in 1964. Minnie and Leonard met at Curtis, where she studied viola.

His second wife was Xenia Petschek, whom he married in January 1965. Xenia Rose died in 2002.

Awards and recognitions 
Grammy Award for Best Chamber Music Performance
Eugene Istomin, Leonard Rose & Isaac Stern for Beethoven: The Complete Piano Trios (1971)

Notes

References

Further reading 
 Leonard Rose.  America's Golden Age and Its First Cellist, Steven Honigberg, (revised edition 2013), Amazon.com 
"With the Artists".  World Famed String Players Discuss Their Art, Samuel and Sada Applebaum, John Markert & Co., New York (1955).  Pages 203–211 are devoted to Leonard Rose.
Liner notes: "Leonard Rose Live in Recital, 1953–1960" VAI; "Seeking Perfection" by Susan M Anderson

1918 births
1984 deaths
American classical cellists
American music educators
Cello pedagogues
Curtis Institute of Music alumni
Deaths from lung cancer in New York (state)
Grammy Award winners
Jewish American musicians
Jewish classical musicians
Ukrainian Jews
20th-century classical musicians
20th-century American musicians
20th-century American Jews
20th-century cellists